Bedoya is a common surname in Spanish-speaking countries. Notable people with the surname include:

Arts and entertainment 
Alfonso Bedoya (1904–1957), Mexican actor, frequently in U.S. films
Lucía Bedoya, Colombian actress and model
Miguel Harth-Bedoya (born 1968), Peruvian conductor

Politics and government 
Alvaro Bedoya (born 1982), American privacy advocate and Federal Trade Commission (FTC) nominee
Carlos García-Bedoya (1925–1980), Peruvian diplomat
Felipe Francisco Molina y Bedoya, Chancellor of the Federal Republic of Central America
Harold Bedoya Pizarro (born 1938), former General and Commander of the Colombian National Army
Hernán Bedoya (died 2017), Colombian land rights activist
Javier Bedoya (born 1948), Peruvian politician and former Congressman from Lima (2006–2011 term)
Jineth Bedoya Lima (born c. 1974), Colombian journalist and advocate
José Díaz de Bedoya, member in Paraguayan Triumvirate following death of Francisco Solano López from November to December 1870
José Manuel García Bedoya, Peruvian politician in the early 1930s
Luis Bedoya Reyes (1919–2021), Peruvian Christian Democrat politician in the late 1960s
María Dolores Bedoya (1783–1853), Guatemalan independence activist

Sports 

 Alejandro Bedoya (born 1987), American soccer player
Gerardo Bedoya (born 1975), Colombian footballer
Jorge Bedoya (1929–2001), Argentinian equestrian
John Jairo Bedoya Jr., known professionally as "Xavier" (1977–2020), American wrestler
Miguel Bedoya (born 1986), Spanish footballer
 Yhonatan Bedoya (born 1996), Colombian footballer

Spanish-language surnames